Stoneham is a town in Middlesex County, Massachusetts, nine miles (14.5 km) north of downtown Boston. Its population was 23,244 at the 2020 census. Its proximity to major highways and public transportation offer convenient access to Boston and the North Shore coastal region and beaches of Massachusetts. The town is the birthplace of the Olympic figure-skating medalist Nancy Kerrigan and is the location of the Stone Zoo.

History 
The earliest documented mention of the territory now called Stoneham dates to 1632 when, on February 7, Governor Winthrop and his party came upon this area. They found Spot Pond and ate their lunch on a place they called Cheese Rock, now known as Bear Hill. Stoneham is situated on the traditional territory of the Massachusett and Pawtucket peoples.

Stoneham was first settled by colonists in 1634 and was originally a part of Charlestown.  In 1678, there were six colonists with their families, all in the northeast part of the town, probably because of its proximity to the settlement in Reading (now Wakefield).

By 1725, the population of the area, called "Charlestown End", had increased until there were 65 male inhabitants paying taxes; however, they were miles away from the settlement in Charlestown and could not conveniently reach its church or school. For this reason, Captain Benjamin Geary and 53 other residents of the area petitioned Charlestown to allow them to be separated. The town refused their petition at first, but on December 17, 1725, the General Court passed an act to establish the new township of Stoneham, separating it from Charlestown, and releasing its residents from the obligation to pay taxes to Charlestown, provided that within two years they would erect a suitable church and hire a minister and a schoolmaster.

The town's first meeting-house was erected in 1726, as was its Burying Ground [now known as the Old Burying Ground and listed on the National Register of Historic Places in 1984.] The first church was organized in 1729, with members being released from the congregations in Reading and Melrose to form it. In the same year, the town voted to raise £9 for the building of a school, and chose a committee to hire a schoolmaster. Stoneham remained a small town during the colonial era. Traces of its colonial history are still to be seen in the Spot Pond Archeological District of the Middlesex Fells Reservation. During the Industrial Revolution, Stoneham prospered as a major shoe-manufacturing center.

Government
Stoneham is part of the Massachusetts's 5th congressional district and is represented by Katherine Clark. The United States Senators are Ed Markey and Elizabeth Warren. Part of the 31st Middlesex District, Mike Day represents the district in the Massachusetts House of Representatives. He replaced Jason Lewis who now represents Stoneham in the Massachusetts Senate for the 5th Middlesex Senate district.

Geography
Stoneham is located at  (42.480145, −71.098352).

According to the United States Census Bureau, the town has a total area of 6.7 square miles (17.4 km2), of which 6.2 square miles (15.9 km2) is land and 0.6 square miles (1.5 km2), or 8.36%, is water.

Stoneham has two exits off Interstate 93, Winchester Highlands and Montvale Avenue and one exit off Interstate 95, Route 28.

Stoneham borders the following cities or towns: Woburn, Winchester, Medford, Melrose, Wakefield, and Reading.

Demographics

At the 2000 census, there were 22,219 people, 9,050 households and 5,873 families residing in the town. The racial makeup was 95.01% White, 2.61% Asian, 0.89% Black or African American, 0.05% Native American, 0.04% Pacific Islander, 0.59% from other races, and 0.90% from two or more races. Hispanic or Latino of any race were 1.79% of the population.

There were 9,050 households, of which 26.7% had children under the age of 18 living with them, 53.1% were married couples living together, 8.8% had a female householder with no husband present, and 35.1% were non-families. 30.1% of all households were made up of individuals, and 13.3% had someone living alone who was 65 years of age or older. The average household size was 2.42 and the average family size was 3.07.

21.0% of the population were under the age of 18, 5.9% from 18 to 24, 30.4% from 25 to 44, 24.3% from 45 to 64, and 18.5% who were 65 years of age or older. The median age was 41 years. For every 100 females, there were 89.0 males. For every 100 females age 18 and over, there were 85.6 males.

The median household income was $56,605 and the median family income was $71,334. Males had a median income of $46,797 and females $37,274. The per capita income was $27,599. About 3.0% of families and 4.1% of the population were below the poverty line, including 5.7% of those under age 18 and 5.5% of those age 65 or over.

Transportation
Stoneham is inside the Route 128 belt that delineates the core of metropolitan Boston. Public transportation is available in or near Stoneham. The Tri-Community Greenway path goes through Stoneham accessible to walkers/bikers. The Oak Grove subway station is 3.8 miles (6.1 km) from Stoneham Center, in Malden, and is the northern terminus of the MBTA's Orange Line. Several commuter rail stations are in bordering communities of Melrose, Winchester, Wakefield, Reading, Medford, Woburn and Malden, each providing transportation to Boston's North Station. The MBTA's 132 bus route travels through Stoneham Center, offering transportation to the Orange Line at Oak Grove and Malden Station. And the MBTA's 325 Express Bus to downtown Boston offers limited service. Interstate 93 passes through Stoneham, and Route 128/Interstate 95 passes just to the north of the town.

Education

Stoneham has one public high school (Stoneham High School) and one public middle school (Stoneham Central Middle School). There are also three public elementary schools (Colonial Park School, Robin Hood School and South School) in the town.

The private Seventh-day Adventist school Greater Boston Academy offers programs for Pre-K to grade 8, and Saint Patrick School, a Catholic school, conducts programs from Pre-K level to grade 8.

Media
Stoneham is served by Boston television and radio stations, the Boston Herald, the Boston Globe and the Stoneham Independent newspaper. Stoneham has a community-access television station, StonehamTV, which broadcasts locally produced content on Comcast, Verizon and RCN cable systems.

Nine O'Clock Horn 

The Nine O'clock Horn, or Nine O'clock Bell/Alarm, is a horn that goes off from the Stoneham Fire Station every day at 9 a.m. and 9 p.m. Originally, the number of blasts of the horn was used to signal different groups to fight fires or alert the town of other emergencies such as a missing child. The 9 a.m and 9 p.m. horns are officially used to test the alert system, however Stoneham Fire staff have stated that these horns remain primarily as a tradition. The horn system is entirely automated.

There have been a few occasions when the bell has not rung, including the September 11, 2001 attacks, and the Boston Marathon Bombing.

Notable people

 Harland Bartholomew, urban planner, active 1911–1962
 Frank N. Blanchard (1888–1937), herpetologist, born in Stoneham
 William Francis Buckley (1927–1985), US Army Officer and CIA Bureau Chief, kidnapped and killed in Lebanon
 Mario Cantone (born 1959), comedian and actor
 Mike Colman, ice hockey player for the 1991–1992 San Jose Sharks
 Elisha S. Converse (1820–1904), inventor, manufacturer, philanthropist
 Sandro Corsaro, American animator and author, active from 2002
 Tom Dockrell, ice hockey player and coach for Colgate Raiders, 1950–1951
 Richard B. Fitzgibbon Jr. (1920–1956), among the first Americans killed in the Vietnam War
 Charles Gibbons (1901–1968), Speaker of the Massachusetts House of Representatives and 1958 candidate for governor
 Jonathan Goff, linebacker for the New York Giants, 2008–2011
 Josh Gondelman (born 1985), comedian, writer for HBO's Last Week Tonight with John Oliver
 George J. Hall (1921–1946), U.S. Army soldier and Medal of Honor recipient in World War II
 Nathaniel Hayward (1808–1865), inventor and manufacturer
 Chris J. Johnson (born 1977), actor
 Nancy Kerrigan, figure skating medalist at the 1992 and 1994 Olympic Games 
 Killer Kowalski, professional wrestler active 1947–1993
 Jay Larson, comedian, actor
 John "Pie" McKenzie, National Hockey League player; member of the 1970 and 1972 Stanley Cup-winning Boston Bruins
 Joe McLaughlin, American football player 1979–1984, linebacker for the Green Bay Packers and New York Giants
 Matt Mira (born 1983), comedian and podcaster
 Carol Sloane (born 1937), jazz singer
 Joe Vitiello, Major League Baseball player from 1995–2003
 Taylor von Kriegenbergh (born 1988), professional poker player
 Steve Yarbrough (born 1956), novelist and professor

Sports 
In addition to the high school sports programs at Stoneham High School, Stoneham also has the Stoneham Sabers amateur team in the Yawkey Baseball League of Greater Boston.

See also
 National Register of Historic Places listings in Stoneham, Massachusetts
 Stone Zoo
 People from Stoneham, Massachusetts

References

Further reading
  History of Stoneham, Massachusetts by William Burnham Stevens, published 1891, 352 pages.
  History of Middlesex County, Massachusetts, Volume 1 (A-H),  Volume 2 (L-W) compiled by Samuel Adams Drake, published 1879 and 1880. 572 and 505 pages.  Stoneham article by Silas Dean in volume 2 pages 339–356.
  Vital Records of Stoneham, Massachusetts, to the End of the Year 1849 By Stoneham (Mass.), Essex Institute, published 1918.
 1871 Atlas of Massachusetts. by Wall & Gray.Map of Massachusetts. Map of Middlesex County.

External links

 Town of Stoneham official website 
 The Stoneham Independent (newspaper)
 Stoneham Chamber of Commerce
 Stoneham Public Library
 StonehamTV

 
Towns in Middlesex County, Massachusetts
Towns in Massachusetts
1725 establishments in Massachusetts
Populated places established in 1725